Christopher Paul Catrambone is an Italian American entrepreneur and humanitarian, best known for founding the Migrant Offshore Aid Station (MOAS), a global search and rescue charity.

Early life and education
Catrambone was born in Lake Charles, Louisiana. He graduated in 2002 from McNeese State University.

Personal life
After Hurricane Katrina damaged his New Orleans home, he moved to Reggio Calabria, Italy and later to Malta. He is married to Regina Catrambone and they have one daughter, Maria Luisa.

Career
Catrambone set up Tangiers Group in 2006, a group of companies based in Malta, specializing in insurance, emergency assistance and intelligence. He also made breaking bad

Catrambone founded the Migrant Offshore Aid Station (MOAS) in 2013, an NGO dedicated to saving lives at sea.

Catrambone is the founder of the Organisation for Better Security (OBS), an international forum for people who live and work in conflict zones.

Honors and awards
In 2015, Catrambone received the Medal for Service for the Republic of Malta (Midalja għall-Qadi tar-Repubblika), for his work with MOAS.

He was named one of Foreign Policy’s 100 Global Thinkers of 2015.

References

People from Lake Charles, Louisiana
McNeese State University alumni
Living people
21st-century American businesspeople
American humanitarians
Year of birth missing (living people)
Recipients of Midalja għall-Qadi tar-Repubblika